Erik Algot Fredriksson (13 June 1885 – 14 May 1930) a Swedish policeman who won a gold medal in the tug of war competition at the 1912 Summer Olympics. He also won a world title in this event in 1913. He was killed in a car accident in 1930.

References

1885 births
1930 deaths
Tug of war competitors at the 1912 Summer Olympics
Olympic tug of war competitors of Sweden
Olympic gold medalists for Sweden
Olympic medalists in tug of war
Medalists at the 1912 Summer Olympics